Andrey Leonidovich Bastunets is a Belarusian lawyer, journalist, musician, and free speech activist. Bastunets was born in Minsk in 1966, he graduated from the Law Faculty of the BSU. Since 2015 he is the chairman of the Belarusian Association of Journalists.

Biography

Education and Career 

Bastunets studied at public school № 117 in Minsk. His first attempt to enter the BSU Law Faculty wasn’t successful so he had to find temporary employment at the Minsk Automobile Plant. He used his vacation to prepare for exams and entered the university the next year. However, during the first semester he was enlisted into the army and spent two years serving within the border troops. After the army he continued his study and graduated with honours. Since the 1990s Bastunets worked as a journalist. Between 1997 and 2000 he was a chief editor of the newspaper ‘Femida Nova’. In 1998 he was awarded with an international diploma ‘For Establishing Peace in Belarus’. In 2001 Bastunets became a legal consultant at the Belarusian Association of Journalists. In 2008-2011 he hosted the TV-show ‘I Have a Right’.

Andrey Bastunets wrote and co-authored multiple researches and books on journalism, its ethics, security, media self-regulatory mechanisms, etc.

In 2015 Bastunets took the post of BAJ chairman after Zhanna Litvina, who resigned after 20 years of service. In Autumn 2020 he entered the Belarusian opposition Coordination Council for the Transfer of Power. Amid a growing pressure on independent media Bastunets was detained by the police, his apartment and BAJ office were searched.

Personal life 
Since 2003 Bastunets is married to journalist and editor Sabina Brilo, he has a son. 

Bastunets writes music and poetry. In the 1990s his poems were published in various periodicals, belarusian newspaper ‘Znamya Unosti’ (trans. Flag of Youth) had his personal column. He was a member of ‘SvetoTen’ (trans. ‘Light and Shade’) poetry club. Bastunets released two albums of his songs. In 2016 he published a book of poems ‘Dokazatelstva Dvizheniya’ (trans.‘Proves of Movement’).

References

Journalists from Minsk
Free speech activists
Belarusian activists
Belarusian dissidents
1966 births
Living people